Dietmar Hummel (born 20 October 1973) is a German former professional footballer who played as a goalkeeper.

References

External links

1973 births
Living people
Association football goalkeepers
German footballers
Germany youth international footballers
SC Freiburg players
Karlsruher SC players
Dynamo Dresden players
VfR Mannheim players
German football managers
Bundesliga players
2. Bundesliga players